The Clausura 2014 season was the 32nd edition of El Salvador's Primera Division since the establishment of an Apertura and Clausura format. Isidro Metapán were the defending champions. The league consisted of 10 teams, each playing a home and away game against the other clubs for a total of 18 games, respectively. The top four teams at the end of the regular season took part in the playoffs.

Stadia and locations

Personnel and sponsoring

Managerial changes

Before the start of the season

During the season

League table

Results

Season statistics

Scoring
First goal of the season:  Ronald Ascencio for UES against Alianza F.C., 11 minutes (19 January 2014)
Fastest goal in a match: 1 minute -  William Maldonado for Santa Tecla F.C. against UES (2 March 2014)
Goal scored at the latest point in a match: 93 minutes -  Irvin Valdez for Juventud Independiente against Santa Tecla F.C. (17 February 2014) &  Héctor Ramos for A.D. Isidro Metapán against Firpo (23 February 2014)
First penalty Kick of the season:  Ricardinho Paraiba for Santa Tecla F.C. against C.D. FAS, 58 minutes (9 February 2014)
Widest winning margin: 5 goals
Atlético Marte 6–1 Firpo (2014)
First hat-trick of the season: Héctor Ramos for A.D. Isidro Metapán against Firpo (23 February 2014)
First own goal of the season: TBD (TBD) for TBD (2014)
Most goals in a match: 8 Goals Santa Tecla F.C. 4–4 Alianza (March 2014)
Most goals by one team in a match: 6 Goals
Atlético Marte 6–1 C.D. Luis Angel Firpo ( March 2014)
Most goals in one half by one team: 3 Goals C.D. Dragón 4–0 Alianza F.C. (3 March 2014)
Most goals scored by losing team: 3 Goals
C.D. Luis Ángel Firpo 3–4 Juventud Independiente (27 April 2014)
Most goals by one player in a single match: 3 Goals
 Héctor Ramos for A.D. Isidro Metapán against Firpo (23 February 2014)

Top scorers

Top goalscorers

Top assists

Hat-tricks

Club

 Most clean sheets: TBD
 TBD
 Fewest clean sheets: TBD
 TBD
 Best Home record during the Clausura season: C.D. FAS
 19 out of 27 points (6 wins, 1 draw and 2 losses)
 Worst Home record during the Clausura season: C.D. Dragon and Atletico Marte
 9 out of 27 points (2 wins, 3 draw and 4 losses)
 Best Away record during the Clausura season: A.D. Isidro Metapan
 20 out of 27 points (6 wins, 2 draw and 1 loss)
 Worst Away record during the Clausura season: Firpo
 7 out of 27 points (1 win, 4 draw and 4 losses)
 Highest scoring team: Atletico Marte, A.D. Isidro Metapan and Juventud Independiente
 28 goals
 Lowest scoring team: Alianza F.C.
 17 goals

Discipline

First yellow card of the season:  Jonathan Jiménez for UES against Alianza F.C., 35 minutes (19 January 2014)
First red card of the season:  Juan Granados for Juventud Independiente against Metapan,  76 minutes (19 January 2014)
Most yellow cards by a player: TBD
TBD (TBD)
Most red cards by a player:  2
 Christoper Ramirez Atletico Marte, Ivan Mancia Santa Tecla F.C., Elman Rivas Alianza F.C., Ricardo Ferreira Santa Tecla F.C., Jermaine Anderson C.D. Aguila
Most yellow cards by a club: 62
C.D. Aguila
Most red cards by a club: 7 
Santa Tecla F.C.

Playoffs

Semi-finals

First leg

Second leg

Metapan won 4–2 on aggregate.

Dragón won 1–0 on aggregate.

Final

List of foreign players in the league
This is a list of foreign players in Clausura 2014. The following players:
have played at least one apertura game for the respective club.
have not been capped for the El Salvador national football team on any level, independently from the birthplace

A new rule was introduced a few season ago, that clubs can only have three foreign players per club and can only add a new player if there is an injury or player/s is released.

C.D. Águila
  Douglas Caetano 
  Jermaine Anderson
  Ismael Rodríguez
  Cristian Sánchez Prette

Alianza F.C.
  Sean Fraser
  Jairo Araujo
  Christian Yeladian

Atlético Marte
 None

C.D. Dragon
  Jhony Rios
  Jimmy Valoyes
  Gabriel Ríos

Juventud Independiente
  Augustine Jibrin
  Santiago Risso
  Jesús Toscanini

 (player released during the season)

C.D. FAS
  Alejandro Bentos
  Gonzalo Mazzia
  Cristian Noriega

C.D. Luis Ángel Firpo
  Roberto Carboni
  Guillermo Pfund
  Anel Canales

A.D. Isidro Metapán
  Héctor Ramos
   David López
  Romeo Ovando Parkes

Santa Tecla F.C.
  Facundo Nicolás Simioli
  Ricardo Ferreira da Silva
  Christian Vaquero

UES
  Klayton da Silva
  Cristian Gil Mosquera
  Garrick Gordon

Aggregate table

External links
 http://www.primerafutboles.com/
 http://www.elgrafico.com/
 http://www.elsalvadorfc.com/
 http://www.culebritamacheteada.com.sv/
 http://www.elsalvadorfutbol.com/

Primera División de Fútbol Profesional Clausura seasons
El
1